The Federation of North Texas Area Universities is an educational consortium of institutions of higher education located around the north part of the State of Texas.

External links
website

Universities and colleges in the Dallas–Fort Worth metroplex
College and university associations and consortia in the United States